Regino "Marmelo" García (1875–?) was a Cuban baseball catcher in the Cuban League and Negro leagues. He played from 1901 to 1914 with several ballclubs, including San Francisco, Almendares, the Fe club, Habana, Cuban Stars (West), Cuban X-Giants, and the All Cubans. He was elected to the Cuban Baseball Hall of Fame in 1941.

References

External links

1875 births
Year of death missing
Cuban League players
Cuban baseball players
All Cubans players
Almendares (baseball) players
Club Fé players
Cuban Stars (West) players
Cuban X-Giants players
Habana players
San Francisco (baseball) players